Howbury Grange was a women's football team which won the Women's FA Cup.

The team was founded in 1981, in Bexley, by Jane Hardman-Brown, a sports teacher, and named for a school at which she had taught.  In 1983, it won the Home Counties League Division 2.  The following season, it was captained by Debbie Bampton, whose father, Albert Bampton, became the manager.  It reached the final of the 1984 Women's FA Cup, but its opponents, the Doncaster Belles, were considered the strong favourites.  Yvonne Baldeo and Terri Springett scored two goals each, bringing about a 4-2 victory.

The 1984/85 season was far less successful, with the team having to withdraw from the Women's FA Cup due to a shortage of players.  In 1990, it reached the cup quarter final.

References

Defunct women's football clubs in England
Defunct football clubs in London
Association football clubs established in 1981
Sport in the London Borough of Bexley
1981 establishments in England